Time Squared is the 14th studio album by American jazz group Yellowjackets, released in 2003. The album reached a peak position of number fifteen on Billboard Top Jazz Albums chart.

Track listing

Personnel 
 Russell Ferrante – keyboards, acoustic piano 
 Jimmy Haslip – electric bass
 Marcus Baylor – drums, percussion 
 Bob Mintzer – tenor saxophone, soprano saxophone, bass clarinet, Bb clarinet, flute, EWI 
with:
 Jean Baylor – vocal on "Healing Waters"

Production 
 Yellowjackets – producers
 Dave Love – executive producer 
 Rich Breen – recording, mixing 
 Ed Woolley – assistant engineer
 Jay Frigoletto – editing, compiling 
 Dave Collins – mastering 
 Margi Denton – graphic design 
 Carol Taylor – cover artwork 
 Dale Gold – photography 
 Ted Kurland & Associates – management

Studios
 Recorded at Firehouse Recording Studios (New York City, New York).
 Mixed at Dogmatic Studios (Burbank, California).
 Mastered at Master Suite (Hollywood, California).

References

2003 albums
Yellowjackets albums
Instrumental albums